Holcosus amphigrammus, also known commonly as the rainbow ameiva, is a species of lizard in the family Teiidae. The species is endemic to in Mexico.

References

amphigrammus
Reptiles of North America
Reptiles described in 1945